Pas Poshteh may refer to:
 Pas Poshteh, Golestan
 Pas Poshteh, Razavi Khorasan